Surrender of General Toral is an 1898 film which featured appearances by military leaders Joseph Wheeler and William Rufus Shafter.

External links

1898 films
American silent short films
American black-and-white films
1898 short films
1890s American films